Fischer Creek State Recreation Area is a state park unit of Wisconsin, United States.  The  park preserves about a mile of shoreline on Lake Michigan flanking the mouth of Fischer Creek.  The site is owned by the state but is developed and managed by the Manitowoc County Park System.  The developments currently consist of trails and day-use amenities.

External links
Official Manitowoc County site
Official state site

1991 establishments in Wisconsin
Protected areas established in 1991
Protected areas of Manitowoc County, Wisconsin
State parks of Wisconsin